V150 may refer to:
 V150 (train), a specially configured TGV train to break the world record for conventional rail trains on April 3, 2007
 Cadillac Gage Commando, an Armored car
 ITU-T V-series Recommendations - V.150, a scheme for carrying legacy modem connections over Internet Protocol